Botkyrka HC was a Swedish ice hockey team. Their home arena was Ishuset in Tumba, just outside Botkyrka in the Stockholm suburbs.

History 
The club was founded in 1998 as a merger between IFK Tumba and Botkyrka IF, taking Tumba's spot in Division 1.

From 2002 to 2004, they qualified for the promotion round to Allsvenskan, but they failed to be promoted all three times.

In August 2013, Botkyrka HC merged with IFK Tumba Hockey, giving IFK Tumba a senior ice hockey team. IFK Tumba IK took Botkyrka HC's spot in Division 1.

References

External links 
 

Ice hockey teams in Sweden